Baltar is a fictional character in the Battlestar Galactica universe who betrays the human race, through willing treachery in the original 1978 series, and as the inadvertent result of arrogance and self-interest in the 2003 miniseries and following TV series.

Original continuity

In the original 1978 Battlestar Galactica movie and television series, Count Baltar was a leading antagonist character who betrayed the human race to its enemy, the robot race of Cylons.  Faced with execution by the Cylons following the successful attack on the humans, Baltar convinces them to let him live so he may be permitted to pursue the surviving humans. 

Count Baltar was played by John Colicos.

New continuity

In the 2003 Battlestar Galactica miniseries and 2004 TV series, Gaius Baltar is a brilliant scientist and key player in the Twelve Colonies' defense research. His unscrupulous character allows a beautiful Cylon to manipulate him into granting her access to the colonies' defense systems, the resultant failure of which ends in the destruction of most of the human race during a Cylon attack.

Gaius is accompanied by the Cylon model Number Six, whom only he can see. The reason why she appears to him is not clear, although in the final episodes it is implied that she may be an angel or a messenger from God.
Gaius also exists inside the mind of the same Six model he fell in love with, but as a completely separate entity.

Dr. Baltar eventually becomes Vice President of the Colonies, then later assumes the Presidency after the first Post-War election, his first executive order being a move to settle on New Caprica. He surrenders the colony over to the Cylons one year later during the Cylon occupation under threat of death.

In sharp contrast to the Count Baltar of the original series, he is not a malicious individual, but rather a highly flawed one. A significant theme in the series is his path to redemption, as in the original series, despite his initial actions.

The role of Dr. Gaius Baltar is played by James Callis.

Battlestar Galactica characters